Robert Gennadyevich Yevdokimov (born 27 February 1970) is a Russian professional football coach and a former player.

Playing career
As a player, he made his debut in the Soviet Second League in 1987 for FC Turbina Brezhnev. He played 6 games and scored 1 goal in the UEFA Intertoto Cup 1996 for FC KAMAZ Naberezhnye Chelny.

He won a Bronze medal representing Russia at the 1995 Summer Universiade.

Coaching career
Under his management, FC Orenburg was promoted to the Russian Premier League for the first time ever at the end of the 2015–16 season. Their debut 2016–17 Russian Premier League season ended with relegation through playoffs, and Yevdokimov left the club.

On 16 October 2019, he was hired as manager of the FNL club FC Nizhny Novgorod. He was dismissed by the club on 4 May 2021, two games before the season ended and the club was promoted to the Russian Premier League.

Honours
Russian Premier League champion: 1997.
Russian First Division best manager: 2010.

References

1970 births
People from Nizhnekamsk
Living people
Soviet footballers
Russian footballers
Association football midfielders
FC Rubin Kazan players
FC KAMAZ Naberezhnye Chelny players
Russian Premier League players
FC Spartak Moscow players
FC Saturn Ramenskoye players
PFC Krylia Sovetov Samara players
Russian football managers
FC KAMAZ Naberezhnye Chelny managers
FC Orenburg managers
Russian Premier League managers
Russian expatriate football managers
Expatriate football managers in Kazakhstan
FC Tobol managers
Russian expatriate sportspeople in Kazakhstan
FC Rotor Volgograd managers
FC Urozhay Krasnodar managers
FC Neftekhimik Nizhnekamsk players
Sportspeople from Tatarstan